Liam Christian James O'Neil (born 31 July 1993) is an English footballer who plays as a defender and midfielder for  club Cambridge United.

Career

West Bromwich Albion
O'Neil is a product of the West Bromwich Albion youth academy, having joined from Non-League club Histon as a youth player. In May 2012, O'Neil signed his first professional contract with the club.

O'Neil then debuted for West Brom in a crucial 2–1 victory over Swansea City on 15 March 2014, and then went on to make two further appearances from the bench against Stoke City and Norwich City respectively. He subsequently was rewarded for his progress with a new deal in May 2014, officially putting pen to paper on a one-year contract, plus a further year's option in the club's favour, on 1 July 2014. He made his Football League Cup debut on 24 September 2014 against Hull City; West Brom ended up winning the match 3–2. O'Neil's performance was praised by Manager Alan Irvine. He made another appearance for West Brom in the League Cup against AFC Bournemouth on 28 October 2014 though West Brom ended up losing the match 2–1.

At the end of the 2014–15 season, O'Neil had his contract extended for another season.

Loan spells
O'Neil gained professional experience during a loan spell at Finnish club VPS in summer 2012. He quickly made an impact for the club in the first team and was named May's Team of the Month. O'Neil would score his first goal for the club, in a 3–1 win over Turun Palloseura on 14 July 2012. O'Neil went on to make eighteen appearances for VPS before returning to England in early August.

In late-November, O'Neil joined Football League One side Scunthorpe United on a one-month loan. Making three appearances so far at the club earned O'Neil a loan extension until 13 January 2014. O'Neil then scored his first goal for the club, in a 2–1 win over Rochdale on Boxing Day. Soon after, O'Neil's loan spell with Scunthorpe United was soon extended until the end of the season. A few weeks later on 31 January 2015, O'Neil scored his second goal for the club, in a 4–1 win over Leyton Orient. However, O'Neil was dropped from the squad before it was revealed he injured his ankle, which saw him returned to his parent club early.

Chesterfield
On 24 August 2015, O'Neil joined League One side Chesterfield for an undisclosed fee.

Cambridge United
On 31 January 2017, O'Neil joined Cambridge United on a three-and-a-half year contract for an undisclosed fee.

In April 2018 O'Neil was awarded the 2017/18 EFL Sky Bet League Two PFA Player in the Community in recognition of his community work with Cambridge United Community Trust.

In August 2019 O'Neil was fined £3,000 by the Football Association after admitting "improper conduct".

O'Neil signed a new one-year contract in May 2022, signing for a seventh season.

Personal life
Born in Newbridge, Kildare, Ireland, O'Neil has said he is open to play for Wales national football team, as his mother is from Mumbles, Wales.

Career statistics

References

External links

1993 births
Living people
English footballers
Association football defenders
West Bromwich Albion F.C. players
Chesterfield F.C. players
Cambridge United F.C. players
Premier League players
Vaasan Palloseura players
Veikkausliiga players
English expatriate sportspeople in Finland
English expatriate footballers
Expatriate footballers in Finland